Babi enters in various Indian titles. Babi or Babai (Pashtun tribe) is a Pashtun Tribe. Babi or Babai is son of Ghorghasht or Gharghashti. It has its origin as quoted 'Bahadur Khanji Babi, son of Usman Khan, who migrated to India and entered the Mughal service and received the hereditary title of Babi in 1554 from Emperor Humayun, for services against the Rana of Chittor'.

Khan Sahib Shri Babi: the title of the ruler of the Indian princely state of Bantva-Manavadar state (founded in 1760) which in September 1947 acceded to Pakistan, but on 15 February 1948 rescinded accession to Pakistan, to accede to India; the dynasty is called Babi.
Nawab Babi: the title of the ruler of the Indian princely state of Sardargadh,  Balasinor; the dynasty is called Babi Dynasty
Babi was also the name of the only ruling dynasty (title Nawab) in the salute state of Radhanpur, where for generations Bahadur Babi followed the ruler's personal name
The same dynasty finally ruled Junagadh, but there Babi was rarely part of the name, and never of the title of the ruling Nawab Saheb

See also
 Pathans of Gujarat

Sources and references
Indian princely states- see each state quoted

References

Pashtun families
Titles in India